Trans Namib Ground (also known as the Centre for Cricket Development Ground) is a cricket ground in Windhoek, Namibia.  The first recorded match on the ground was in 1998 when a Windhoek Select XI played Denmark. 

The ground held its first List A match in the 2001/02 6 Nations Challenge when Canada played the Netherlands.  To date the ground has held 11 List A matches, the last of which saw Argentina play Uganda in the 2007 ICC World Cricket League Division Two.

References

External links
Centre for Cricket Development Ground, Windhoek at ESPNcricinfo
Trans Namib Ground, Windhoek at CricketArchive

Cricket grounds in Namibia
Buildings and structures in Windhoek